Nam Fung Chau is an island of Hong Kong, under the administration of Sai Kung District. It is located in Rocky Harbour (Leung Shuen Wan Hoi ).

Uninhabited islands of Hong Kong
Sai Kung District
Islands of Hong Kong